St. Nicodemus of Palermo (died 1083) was a Sicilian Eastern Orthodox bishop.

History
The early Orthodox church of Sicily was Byzantine and part of the Patriarchate of Constantinople. Under Muslim rule, from around 827 until the 1060s, Christians in Sicily, like Jews, became a subjugated people, mildly persecuted and highly taxed but allowed, in most cases, to practice their religion and professions. In Palermo alone there were twenty Orthodox Churches.

In 1072, he celebrated the entry of Roger I of Sicily to Palermo and the end of the Muslim rule over the city. The old Church of Saint Mary, which had been turned into a mosque some two hundred and forty years earlier, was reconsecrated and Nicodemus celebrated a Divine Liturgy there. The new rulers, after establishing their position, sent him to live outside the city in the area now called Mezzomonreale. Because of his fidelity to the Eastern Orthodox Church, he was sent from Palermo. The new political power installed a bishop loyal to Rome in the city.

Nicodemus died in 1083. His body is buried in a stone sarcophagus in the crypt of the Norman era Palermo Cathedral.

Established on 5 May 2002, the Cross of Merit of Saint Nicodemus, Orthodox Bishop of Palermo, was instituted by his successor Lorenzo, Metropolitan of the Ukrainian Autocephalous Orthodox Church - Abroad and Archbishop of Palermo and All Italy, as an award of merit for those who serve the Church in Palermo or who are benefactors of that Church.

It is awarded as a meritorious cross by the Confraternity of the Knights of the Most Holy Trinity, of which Archbishop Lorenzo is Grand Master.

References

1083 deaths
Eastern Orthodox saints
Sicilian saints
11th-century Christian saints
Year of birth unknown
Religious leaders from Palermo